Jonas Eliasson (born 3 February 1969) is a Swedish professor, transportation specialist and former director of the transport administration in the city of Stockholm.

Biography 
Jonas Eliasson was born on February 3, 1969, to Ingemar Eliasson, a former government minister and county governor.

Education and career 
Eliasson was a professor of transport system analysis at the KTH Royal Institute of Technology, Stockholm from 2007 until 2016. He was actively involved in the discussions on traffic planning in several large cities in Sweden and abroad. He has been working with road congestion pricing and cost benefit analysis.

He has been a member of the Royal Swedish Academy of Engineering Sciences since 2009.

Eliasson was the director of the transport administration in the city of Stockholm from 2016 until early 2019  and is a professor in transport systems at Linköping University. From November 2019, Eliasson is the goal director for accessibility at the Swedish Transport Administration.

References

External links 
 TED talk of Jonas Eliasson on how to solve traffic jams.
 Personal home page.

1969 births
Living people
Academic staff of the KTH Royal Institute of Technology
Members of the Royal Swedish Academy of Engineering Sciences